Chalkwell railway station is on the London, Tilbury and Southend line, serving the locality of Chalkwell in Southend-on-Sea, Essex. Its three-letter station code is CHW.

It was opened in 1933 on a site next to the beach. There is no step-free access available. The station and all trains serving it are currently operated by c2c.

Services 

The typical off-peak service frequency is:

 4 tph (trains per hour) westbound towards London Fenchurch Street, of which:
2 tph call at all stations via 
2 tph call at all stations via the  branch
 4 tph eastbound towards , of which:
 2 tph terminate at 
 2 tph continue to Shoeburyness

References

External links 

Railway stations in Southend-on-Sea
Railway stations in Essex
DfT Category C2 stations
Former London, Midland and Scottish Railway stations
Railway stations in Great Britain opened in 1933
Railway stations served by c2c
Buildings and structures in Southend-on-Sea